KSPX-TV (channel 29) is a television station in Sacramento, California, United States, airing programming from the Ion Television network. It is owned and operated by the Ion Media subsidiary of the E. W. Scripps Company, and maintains offices on Prospect Park Drive in Rancho Cordova; its transmitter is located at TransTower in Walnut Grove, California.

History
The station first signed on the air on August 27, 1990, as KCMY; it originally operated as the area's Home Shopping Club affiliate before joining the InfoMall TV network in the mid-1990s.

In 1995, then-CBS affiliate KXTV agreed to provide some programming to KCMY in order to give it more of a competitive edge in the Sacramento market. KCMY began airing the tabloid show Geraldo at 10 p.m. as well as the KXTV-produced health magazine show Pulse.

Paxson Communications (now Ion Media) purchased the station in 1998, changing its call sign to KSPX. The station became a charter owned-and-operated station of its new Pax TV network (later i: Independent Television and now Ion) on August 31, 1998. KSPX became the second English-language station and third overall station in the Sacramento market to be owned and operated by its affiliated network.

Technical information

Subchannels
The station's digital signal is multiplexed:

In 2014, KSPX began simulcasting Telemundo affiliate KCSO-LD on digital subchannel 33.2. The simulcast was discontinued in October 2021.

Analog-to-digital conversion
KSPX shut down its analog signal, over UHF channel 29, on June 12, 2009, as part of the federally mandated transition from analog to digital television. The station's digital signal remained on its pre-transition UHF channel 48, using PSIP to display KSPX-TV's virtual channel as 29 on digital television receivers.

Reduced power operation
On August 30, 2019, the station temporarily reduced power, per special temporary authority (STA), from 1,000 kW to 4.3 kW to accommodate relocation of its transmitter site.

Power was increased to 48 kW on November 16, 2019. Another increase to 388 kW took place on April 29, 2020. The completion of the main facility and subsequent increase to 1,000 kW took place later in 2020.

References

External links

Ion Television affiliates
Court TV affiliates
Laff (TV network) affiliates
Bounce TV affiliates
Defy TV affiliates
TrueReal affiliates
Scripps News affiliates
Television channels and stations established in 1990
1990 establishments in California
SPX-TV